Mukua may refer to:

 Mukua, or mucua, the fruit of the baobab Adansonia digitata as used in Angola
 Mukua River, a river in Taiwan

See also 
 Mukwa (disambiguation)